AOX or Aox can refer to:
Adsorbable organic halides, a group of halogenated organic substances that are able to adsorb onto activated carbon
Aox Inc., a defunct American manufacturer of computer expansion cards
Antioxidant
Alternative oxidase, an enzyme that forms part of the electron transport chain in mitochondria of different organisms